2018 European Artistic Gymnastics Championships may refer to:

2018 European Men's Artistic Gymnastics Championships
2018 European Women's Artistic Gymnastics Championships

European Artistic Gymnastics Championships